Haji Jamal Uddin Degree (Hon's) College is a government college which situated on the bank of river Baral in Bhungura under Pabna district in Bangladesh. It held first position in Bhungura upazila.

References

Pabna District